Henry Johnson Eyring (born September 19, 1963) is an American academic administrator who has been the 17th president of Brigham Young University–Idaho (BYU–Idaho) since April 10, 2017. Since April 2019, he has also served as an area seventy in the Church of Jesus Christ of Latter-day Saints (LDS Church). He previously served as both the Academic and Advancement vice president at BYU-Idaho, as well as director of the Marriott School of Business (MSB) MBA program at Brigham Young University (BYU).

Early life and education
Eyring was born in Palo Alto, California, a son of Henry B. Eyring and Kathleen (née Johnson). Eyring's family lived in the San Francisco Bay Area while his father taught at the Stanford Graduate School of Business until 1971, after which they moved to Rexburg, Idaho, where his father was appointed president of Ricks College (present-day BYU–Idaho). From 1982 to 1984, Eyring served as a full-time missionary for the LDS Church in the Japan Nagoya Mission. Eyring is a graduate of BYU, where he received a Bachelor of Science degree in geology, an M.B.A., and Juris Doctor.

Career

Business
From 1989 to 1998, Eyring was with a Cambridge, Massachusetts management-consulting firm, Monitor Group, which was founded in 1983 by six entrepreneurs with Harvard Business School (HBS) ties. He has also served as a director of SkyWest Airlines since 1995. From 2002 to 2003, he was a special partner with Peterson Capital.

Academia
From 1998 to 2002, Eyring served in the MSB as director of BYU's MBA program.

Eyring began employment at BYU-Idaho in 2006. Eyring initially served as an Associate Academic Vice President, with responsibility for online learning and instructional technology. From 2008 to 2015, Eyring served as BYU–Idaho's Advancement Vice President. He then served from 2015 to 2017 as BYU–Idaho's Academic Vice President. On February 7, 2017, Dallin H. Oaks of the Quorum of the Twelve Apostles announced that Eyring would succeed Clark Gilbert as president of BYU–Idaho, effective April 10, 2017. His official inauguration occurred on September 19, 2017.  

In 2011, while serving as BYU–Idaho's Advancement Vice President, Eyring co-authored The Innovative University: Changing the DNA of Higher Education with HBS professor Clayton M. Christensen, discussing the future of higher education and making college economically viable while conducting an in depth look at the histories of Harvard University and BYU-Idaho. Eyring has also served as a trustee of Southern Utah University and is an adjunct fellow at the Clayton Christensen Institute for Disruptive Innovation.

Personal life
Eyring and his wife, Kelly, have five children and reside in Rexburg, Idaho. Eyring's oldest son, Henry, is a BYU-Idaho and HBS graduate and, since August 2022, an assistant accounting professor at Duke University's Fuqua School of Business.  

Eyring is a grandson of American theoretical chemist Henry Eyring and wrote a biography of his grandfather entitled Mormon Scientist: The Life and Faith of Henry Eyring. He also co-wrote a biography about his father, Henry B. Eyring, an educational administrator and LDS Church leader, entitled I Will Lead You Along: The Life of Henry B. Eyring.

Eyring's great-great-grandmother was a member of the Romney family.

In addition to his work in academia, Eyring has served in various leadership positions within the LDS Church, including as president of the Japan Tokyo North Mission, bishop, and stake president. Eyring was sustained an area seventy during the church's general conference on April 6, 2019.

Bibliography 
Books authored or coauthored by Eyring

See also
List of presidents of Brigham Young University–Idaho
List of J. Reuben Clark Law School alumni
Brigham Young University-Idaho

References

External links

1963 births
21st-century Mormon missionaries
American leaders of the Church of Jesus Christ of Latter-day Saints
American Mormon missionaries in Japan
Brigham Young University alumni
Brigham Young University faculty
Living people
Marriott School of Management alumni
Mission presidents (LDS Church)
People from Rexburg, Idaho
Southern Utah University people
Writers from Palo Alto, California
J. Reuben Clark Law School alumni
Latter Day Saints from California
Latter Day Saints from Idaho
Latter Day Saints from Massachusetts
Latter Day Saints from Utah